Tawqani (Aymara tawqaña to pile up, -ni a suffix, also spelled Taucani) is a mountain in the Andes of Bolivia which reaches a height of approximately . It is located in the La Paz Department, Larecaja Province, Quiabaya Municipality, northwest of Tacacoma.

References 

Mountains of La Paz Department (Bolivia)